Thelin may refer to:
Sitaxentan, a medication

People with the surname
Björn Thelin (1942–2017), a member of The Spotnicks
Eje Thelin (1938–1990), a Swedish trombonist
Howard J. Thelin (1921–2011)
Håkon Thelin (born 1976), a Norwegian musician
Isaac Kiese Thelin (born 1992), a Swedish footballer
Jimmy Thelin (born 1978), a Swedish footballer
Mats Thelin (born 1961), a Swedish retired ice hockey player
Tommy Thelin (born 1983), a Swedish footballer
Adrien Thélin (1842–1922), a Swiss politician